This is a list of winners and nominees for the Kids' Choice Award for Favorite Female Artist, given at the Nickelodeon Kids' Choice Awards. It was first awarded in 2000 at the 13th Kids' Choice Awards

The most awarded female artist in this category is Ariana Grande with 5 wins, followed by Selena Gomez with 4 wins. Grande has also won the award 4 consecutive years (2019-2022).
The artists who have received the most nominations, as of the 2020 ceremony, are Taylor Swift and Beyoncé, with ten nominations each, followed by Selena Gomez with nine.

Winners and nominations

Most wins
5 wins 
Ariana Grande (4 consecutive)

4 wins 
Selena Gomez (2 consecutive)

2 wins
Miley Cyrus (2 consecutive)
Katy Perry
Britney Spears (2 consecutive)
Taylor Swift

Most nominations

8 nominations 
Beyoncé
Taylor Swift

7 nominations 
Selena Gomez
Ariana Grande

5 nominations 
Jennifer Lopez
Katy Perry

4 nominations 
Miley Cyrus
Brandy
Alicia Keys
Pink
Britney Spears
3 nominations 
Adele
Christina Aguilera
Hilary Duff
Lady Gaga

2 nominations 
Ashanti
Nicki Minaj
Rihanna
Meghan Trainor
Cardi B

References

Female Singer
Awards established in 2000

Music awards honoring women